The Hoek, Mann and Jahns system is a system of taxonomy of algae. It was first published in Algae: An Introduction to Phycology by Cambridge University Press in 1995.

Division Cyanophyta (= Cyanobacteria) 

 Class Cyanophyceae
 Order Chroococcales (e.g., Cyanothece, Aphanothece, Merismopedia, Chroococcus, Gloeocapsa, Microcystis, Chamaesiphon)
 Order Pleurocapsales (e.g., Cyanocystis, Pleurocapsa)
 Order Oscillatoriales (e.g., Oscillatoria, Lyngbya, Microcoleus)
 Order Nostocales (e.g., Nostoc, Anabaena, Aphanizomenon, Scytonema, Rivularia)
 Order Stigonematales (e.g., Stigonema)

Division Prochlorophyta 

 Class Prochlorophyceae (e.g., Prochloron, Prochlorococcus, Prochlorothrix)

Division Glaucophyta 

 Class Glaucophyceae (e.g., Cyanophora, Glaucocystis)

Division Rhodophyta 

 Class Bangiophyceae
 Order Porphyridiales (e.g., Porphyridium, Chroodactylon)
 Order Rhodochaetales (e.g., Rhodochaete)
 Order Erythropeltidales (e.g., Erythrotrichia)
 Order Compsogonales 
 Order Bangiales (e.g., Porphyra, Bangia)
 Class Florideophyceae
 Order Acrochaetiales (e.g., Audouinella)
 Order Palmariales (e.g., Palmaria, Rhodophysema)
 Order Nemaliales (e.g., Nemalion, Galaxaura)
 Order Batrachospermales (e.g., Lemanea, Batrachospermum)
 Order Corallinales (e.g., Lithophyllum, Jania)
 Order Hildebrandiales 
 Order Bonnemaisoniales
 Order Gelidiales (e.g., Gelidium)
 Order Gigartinales (e.g., Acrosymphyton, Dumontia, Chondrus, Mastocarpus)
 Order Gracilariales
 Order Ahnfeltiales
 Order Rhodymeniales (e.g., Chylocladia)
 Order Ceramiales (e.g., Polysiphonia, Callithamnion, Ceramium, Hypoglossum)

Division Heterokontophyta 

 Class Chrysophyceae
 Order Ochromonadales (e.g., Ochromonas, Pseudokephyrion, Dinobryon)
 Order Mallomonadales (= Class Synurophyceae, e.g., Mallomonas, Synura)
 Order Pedinellales (= Class Pedinellophyceae, e.g., Pedinella)
 Order Chrysamoebidales (e.g., Rhizochrysis, Chrysarachnion)	
 Order Chrysocapsales (e.g., Chrysocapsa, Hydrurus)
 Order Chrysosphaerales (e.g., Chrysosphaera)
 Order Phaeothamniales (e.g., Phaeothamnion, Thallochrysis)
 Class Parmophyceae
 Order Parmales (e.g., Pentalamina)
 Class Sarcinochrysidophyceae
 Order Sarcinochrysidales (e.g., Ankylochrysis, Sarcinochrysis, Nematochrysis)
 Genus Pelagococcus (relative of the Chrysophyceae)
 Class Xanthophyceae
 Order Chloramoebales (e.g., Chloromeson)
 Order Rhizochloridales (e.g., Rhizochloris, Myxochloris)
 Order Heterogloeales (e.g., Gloeochloris)
 Order Mischococcales (e.g., Chloridella, Botrydiopsis, Characiopsis, Ophiocytium)
 Order Tribonematales (e.g., Tribonema, Heterococcus, Heterodendron)
 Order Botrydiales (e.g., Botrydium)
 Order Vaucheriales (e.g., Vaucheria)
 Class Eustigmatophyceae (e.g., Ellipsoidion, Eustigmatos [= Pleurochloris], Polyedriella, Vischeria, Chlorobotrys, Nannochloropsis)
 Class Bacillariophyceae (= Diatomophyceae)
 Order Pennales (e.g., Navicula, Gyrosigma, Achnanthes, Tabellaria, Nitzchia, Surirella)
 Order Centrales (e.g., Coscinodiscus, Thalassiosira, Stephanodiscus, Cerataulus, Triceratium, Odontella, Rhizosolenia)
 Class Raphidophyceae (e.g., Chatonella, Gonyostomum, Merotrichia, Vacuolaria, Fibrocapsa)
 Class Dictyochophyceae (e.g., Dictyocha)
 Class Phaeophyceae
 Order Ectocarpales (e.g., Phaeostroma, Spongonema, Ectocarpus)
 Order Sphacelariales (e.g., Sphacelaria)
 Order Syringodermatales
 Order Dictyotales (e.g., Dictyota)
 Order Scytosiphonales (e.g., Scytosiphon)
 Order Cutleriales (e.g., Cutleria)
 Order Dictyosiphonales (e.g., Dictyosiphon)
 Order Chordariales (e.g., Sphaerotrichia, Liebmania, Elachista) 
 Order Sporochnales
 Order Desmarestiales (e.g., Desmarestia) 
 Order Laminariales (e.g., Laminaria, Chorda)
 Order Fucales (e.g., Fucus, Hormosira)
 Order Durvillaeales (e.g., Durvillaea)
 Order Ascoseirales
 Class Bicocoecida (e.g., Pseudobodo, Cafeteria)
 Class Oomycetes (e.g., Phytophthora)
 Class Hyphochytridiomycetes 
 Class Labyrinthulomycetes

Division Haptophyta (= Prymnesiophyta) 

 Class Haptophyceae
 Order Prymnesiales (e.g., Chrysochromulina, Prymnesium, Corymbellus, Phaeocystis)
 Order Isochrysidales (e.g., Chrysotila, Pleurochrysis [= Hymenomonas])
 Order Coccolithophorales (e.g., Emiliania, Syracosphaera, Discosphaera)
 Order Pavlovales (e.g., Pavlova)

Division Cryptophyta 

 Class Cryptophyceae (e.g., Cryptomonas, Chilomonas, Bjornbergiella)

Division Dinophyta 

 Class Dinophyceae
 Order Gymnodiniales (e.g., Gymnodinium, Symbiodinium, Polykrikos)
 Order Gloeodiniales (e.g., Gloeodinium)
 Order Thoracosphaerales (e.g., Thoracosphaera)
 Order Phytodiniales (= Dinococcales, e.g., Phytodinium)
 Order Dinotrichales (e.g., Dinoclonium)
 Order Dinamoebidales (e.g., Stylodinium, Dinamoebidium)
 Order Noctilucales (e.g., Noctiluca)
 Order Blastodiniales (e.g., Blastodinium)
 Order Syndiniales
 Order Peridiniales (e.g., Peridinium, Protoperidinium, Ceratium, Gonyaulax)
 Order Dynophysiales (e.g., Dinophysis, Triposolenia, Amphisolenia, Ornithocercus, Histioneis)
 Order Prorocentrales (e.g., Prorocentrum)

Division Euglenophyta 

 Class Euglenophyceae
 Order Euglenales (e.g., Euglena, Astasia)
 Order Eutreptiales
 Order Euglenamorphales
 Order Rhabdomonadales
 Order Sphenomonadales
 Order Heteronematales

Division Chlorarachniophyta 

 Class Chlorarachniophyceae (e.g., Chlorarachnion)

Division Chlorophyta 

 Class Prasinophyceae
 Order Mamiellales (e.g., Mamiella, Bathycoccus)
 Order Pseudoscourfieldiales (e.g., Nephroselmis)
 Order Pyramimonadales (e.g., Pyramimonas, Halosphaera, Pachysphaera [?], Pterosperma [?], Mesostigma [?])
 Genus Pedinomonas (sometimes classified in the class Pedinophyceae, or Loxophyceae)
 Order Chlorodendrales (e.g., Tetraselmis)
 Class Chlorophyceae
 Order Volvocales [including the Tetrasporales] (e.g., Chlamydomonas, Chlorogonium, Hyalogonium, Gloeomonas, Diplostauron, Polytoma, Carteria, Brachiomonas, Lobomonas, Sphaerellopsis, Haematococcus, Phacotus, Pteromonas, Stephanosphaera, Gonium, Pandorina, Eudorina, Volvox, Pseudosphaerocystis)
 Order Chlorococcales (e.g., Chlorococcum, Golenkinia, Chlorella, Chodatella, Oocystis, Kirchneriella, Nephrocytium, Actinastrum, Crucigenia, Sphaerocystis, Coccomyxa, Scenedesmus, Hydrodictyon, Pediastrum, Chlorosarcinopsis, Cylindrocapsa, Geminella, Binuclearia, Radiofilum, Sphaeroplea, Characiosiphon, Atractomorpha)
 Order Chaetophorales (e.g., Uronema, Stigeoclonium, Draparnaldia, Schizomeris)
 Order Oedogoniales (e.g., Oedogonium)
 Class Ulvophyceae
 Order Codiolales (e.g., Chlorocystis, Ulothrix, Spongomorpha, Urospora, Acrosiphonia, Monostroma)
 Order Ulvales (e.g., Ulva, Enteromorpha, Ulvaria, Acrochaete)
 Class Cladophorophyceae
 Order Cladophorales (e.g., Cladophora, Chaetomorpha, Rhizoclonium, Struvea, Valonia, Siphonocladus, Dictyosphaeria)
 Class Bryopsidophyceae
 Order Bryopsidales (e.g., Bryopsis, Pseudobryopsis, Derbesia, Codium)
 Order Halimedales (e.g., Udotea, Penicillus, Halimeda, Caulerpa)
 Class Dasycladophyceae
 Order Dasycladales (e.g., Acetabularia, Batophora, Dasycladus, Neomeris, Cymopolia)
 Class Trentepohliophyceae
 Order Trentepohliales (e.g., Trentepohlia, Cephaleuros)
 Class Pleurastrophyceae
 Order Pleurastrales (e.g., Trebouxia, Myrmecia, Friedmannia, Pleurastrosarcina, Pleurastrum, Microthamnion)
 Position uncertain: 
 Order Prasiolales (e.g., Prasiola)
 Class Klebsormidiophyceae
 Order Klebsormidiales (e.g., Chlorokybus, Raphidonema, Klebsormidium)
 Order Coleochaetales (e.g., Chaetosphaeridium, Coleochaete)
 Class Zygnematophyceae
 Order Zygnematales (e.g., Spirogyra, Mougeotia, Zygnema, Spirotaenia, Cylindrocystis, Netrium)
 Order Desmidiales (e.g., Cosmarium, Gonatozygon, Closterium, Pleurotaenium, Tetmemorus, Euastrum, Micrasterias, Cosmocladium, Xanthidium, Staurastrum, Desmidium, Hyalotheca, Spondylosium, Sphaerozosma, Onychonema)
 Class Charophyceae
 Order Charales (e.g., Chara, Lamprothamnium, Nitellopsis, Nitella, Tolypella)

Note added in proof
In a note added in proof, an alternative classification is presented for the class Chlorophyceae:

 Class Chlamydophyceae
Order Volvocales 
Order Chaetophorales
Order Chlorococcales (e.g., Chlorococcum, Chlorosarcinopsis, Cylindrocapsa [?])
 Class Chlorophyceae 
 Order Chlorellales (e.g., Chlorella, Kirchneriella, Scenedesmus, Hydrodictyon, Pediastrum, Sphaeroplea, Atractomorpha)
 Class Oedogoniophyceae
Order Oedogoniales (e.g., Oedogonium)
Many examples of genus given in the book could not be assigned to one of these classes, because the ultrastructural characteristics needed for their classification have not yet been studied.

References

External links 

 

Systems of algal taxonomy